The Dawes Galaxy is a range of touring bicycles manufactured by Dawes of the United Kingdom.

The Galaxy series is popular amongst touring cyclists because of features such as a long wheelbase and a slightly heavier but stiffer frame which allows luggage to be loaded on the bike. When introduced in 1971, the Galaxy was an off-the-peg touring bicycle at a time when tourers were usually expensive custom-built machines.

By 2009, the range included the Galaxy Cromo, Galaxy Plus, Galaxy Classic, Galaxy Excel, Galaxy Al & Cross Al and the Galaxy Twin tandem bicycle.  Frame materials include Reynolds steel, Aluminium alloy and Titanium. In 2011 the range was slimmed down and the Galaxy Plus and Titanium  Ultra Galaxy Ti models dropped. In November 2020 it was announced that manufacture of the Dawes Galaxy line of touring bikes would cease with immediate effect.

References

External links
 Dawes Cycles

Road cycles